The Great Palmiste River is a river of Grenada. It's in the west part of the country, 9 kilometers north of Saint George.

See also
List of rivers of Grenada

References
 GEOnet Names Server
Grenada map

Rivers of Grenada